Shorea collina (called, along with some other species in the genus Shorea, red balau) is a species of tree in the family Dipterocarpaceae. It grows naturally in Peninsular Malaysia.

References

collina
Flora of Peninsular Malaysia
Taxonomy articles created by Polbot